Knight of the Trail is a 1915 American short silent Western film directed by and starring William S. Hart.

Cast
 William S. Hart as Jim Treen
 Leona Hutton as Molly Stewart
 Frank Borzage as Bill Carey

Reception
Like many American films of the time, Knight of the Trail was subject to cuts by city and state film censorship boards. The Chicago Board of Censors required a cut of the scene of Jim being shot and the shooting by Jim.

References

External links
 
 
  Knight of the Trail available for free download at the Internet Archive

1915 films
1915 Western (genre) films
American black-and-white films
American silent short films
Films directed by William S. Hart
Articles containing video clips
Censored films
Silent American Western (genre) films
1910s American films
1910s English-language films